Harhys Rizal Gareth Stewart (born 20 March 2001) is a Singaporean professional footballer who plays as a central-midfielder, defensive-midfielder or centre-back for Singapore Premier League club Young Lions. He is the younger brother of Ryhan Stewart, who’s also a professional footballer for Chiang Mai FC.

Club career

Young Lions
Haryhs signed for Young Lions in 2020. He made his professional debut on March 1, 2020 in a 1–4 loss against Hougang United. He was named in Goal Singapore's NxGn 2020 list shortly after his first appearance at senior level.

Personal life
Harhys was born in Singapore to a Welsh father and a Singaporean Malay mother. His older brother, Ryhan Stewart, is also a footballer playing for Changmai FC. Harhys also lived in the United Arab Emirates and Finland, before eventually returning to his home country.

Along with teammates Ilhan Fandi, Danial Scott Crichton, Haziq Alaba and Rasaq Akeem, Harhys runs an online shop selling clothing.

Career statistics

Club

Notes

International

U23 International caps

U23 International goals

U19 International caps

References

2001 births
Living people
Singaporean footballers
Singaporean people of Welsh descent
Singaporean people of Malay descent
Association football defenders
Singapore Premier League players
Hougang United FC players
Young Lions FC players
Singapore youth international footballers
Competitors at the 2021 Southeast Asian Games
Southeast Asian Games competitors for Singapore